Lodge Evans de Montmorency, 1st Viscount Frankfort de Montmorency PC (26 January 1747 – 21 September 1822), known as Lodge Morres until 1800 and as The Lord Frankfort between 1800 and 1816, was an Irish politician.

Background
Born Lodge Morres, he was the son of Redmond Morres and Elizabeth, daughter of Francis Lodge. Hervey Morres, 1st Viscount Mountmorres and Sir William Morres, 1st Baronet, were his uncles.

Political career
Morres was elected a member of the Irish House of Commons for Inistioge in 1768, a seat he held until 1770, and later represented Bandon Bridge between 1776 and 1796, Ennis between 1796 and 1797, and Dingle between 1798 and 1800. He was sworn of the Irish Privy Council in 1796 and served as a Lord of the Treasury between 1796 and 1806.

In 1800 he was raised to the Peerage of Ireland as Baron Frankfort, of Galmoye in the County of Kilkenny. In 1815 he assumed by Royal licence the surname of de Montmorency in lieu of Morres, although the French House of Montmorency did not recognise his claim to be a member of that family. In 1816 he was further honoured when he was made Viscount Frankfort de Montmorency, of Galmoye in the County of Kilkenny, also in the Peerage of Ireland.

Family
Lord Frankfort de Montmorency was twice married. He married Mary, daughter of Joseph Fade, in 1777. After her death in February 1787, he married Catharine, daughter of George White, in 1804. There were children from both marriages. Lord Frankfort de Montmorency died in September 1822, aged 75, and was succeeded in his titles by his son from his second marriage, Lodge. The Viscountess Frankfort de Montmorency died in November 1851.

References

|-

1747 births
1822 deaths
Viscounts in the Peerage of Ireland
Peers of Ireland created by George III
Members of the Privy Council of Ireland
Irish MPs 1769–1776
Irish MPs 1776–1783
Irish MPs 1783–1790
Irish MPs 1790–1797
Irish MPs 1798–1800
Commissioners of the Treasury for Ireland
Members of the Parliament of Ireland (pre-1801) for County Kilkenny constituencies
Members of the Parliament of Ireland (pre-1801) for County Cork constituencies
Members of the Parliament of Ireland (pre-1801) for County Clare constituencies
Members of the Parliament of Ireland (pre-1801) for County Kerry constituencies
Under-Secretaries for Ireland